Colegio de la Inmaculada (Immaculate Conception's College in English) is a Catholic school for primary and secondary education (grades 1 to 12) run by the Jesuits in Gijón, Spain since 1890.

History
Established on the outskirts of the city of Gijón by the Society of Jesus at the end of the 19th century, it used to be a boys' school. Since 1972, it's a coeducational institution with about the same ratio of boys and girls. During the Spanish Civil War it was totally destroyed. The current facilities were reconstructed in 1941.

The school was visited by the following Superior Generals of the Society of Jesus:

1924: Wlodimir Ledóchowski, S.J.
1970: Pedro Arrupe, S.J.
2013: Adolfo Nicolás, S.J.

Extracurricular activities

Athletics

The soccer program has an outstanding history of success, with several national championship titles and many players turning professional, including some international caps with the national team like Eloy, Manjarín or Bango. Basketball, handball and roller hockey teams also keep excellent winning records.

The school has two olympic gold medalists, Javier Manjarín in soccer (1992) and Ángela Pumariega in sailing (2012).

Magazine
The school's magazine, "Páginas escolares", was first published on June 29, 1904, and it was the first ever journal published at a Jesuit school in the world. It is now the oldest running school journal in Spain.

Exchange programs
The school keeps exchange programs for teachers and students with St Aloysius' College, Glasgow and Kolleg St. Blasien.

Colors
School colors are light blue and white, traditional colors of the cape and tunic of the Immaculate Conception. Athletic uniforms are white and light blue, while warm-up clothing is black, like the Jesuit cassock.

Songs
The singing of the school's anthem is a tradition on every important celebration carried out at the school.

Headmasters

1932–1942 the school was closed due to Spanish Civil War.

Notable alumni 

Ramón Pérez de Ayala, writer.
Torcuato Fernández-Miranda, former prime minister of Spain.
Emilio Botín, banker, executive chairman of Grupo Santander.
Pedro de Silva, politician, former president of the Principality of Asturias.
Juan Suárez Botas, illustrator.
Enrique Figaredo, S.J., Jesuit, apostolic prefect of Battambang.
Eloy, former international soccer player.
Manjarín, former international soccer player and olympic gold medalist.
Ángela Pumariega, sailor and Olympic gold medalist.

See also
 List of Jesuit sites

References

External links
 Official website

 
Gijón
Secondary schools in Spain
Jesuit secondary schools in Spain
1890 establishments in Spain